Patricio Javier Almonacid González (born September 11, 1979, in Puerto Montt, Los Lagos Region) is a Chilean professional road bicycle racer. He competed in the road race at the 2008 Summer Olympics but failed to finish the race.

Major results

2007
 7th Time trial, Pan American Road Championships
2008
 3rd Road race, National Road Championships
2011
 8th Overall Vuelta Ciclista de Chile
 10th Overall Volta Ciclística Internacional do Rio Grande do Sul
2012
 1st Overall Vuelta Ciclista de Chile
1st Stages 1 (TTT) & 4
2014
 2nd Overall Volta do Paraná
 10th Time trial, Pan American Road Championships
2015
 1st Points classification Vuelta Mexico Telmex
 3rd Time trial, National Road Championships
2016
 3rd Time trial, National Road Championships
 4th Time trial, Pan American Road Championships
2017
 3rd  Time trial, Bolivarian Games
 3rd Road race, National Road Championships
 7th Overall Vuelta Ciclista de Chile

External links 

sports-reference

Chilean male cyclists
Cyclists at the 2008 Summer Olympics
Olympic cyclists of Chile
1979 births
Living people
People from Puerto Montt
Cyclists at the 2015 Pan American Games
Pan American Games competitors for Chile